John Canynges (died 1405) was the member of the Parliament of England for Bristol for the parliament of October 1383 and of Marlborough for the parliament of September 1397.

He was also bailiff, sheriff, tax collector and mayor of Bristol at different times.

References 

Members of Parliament for Marlborough
English MPs October 1383
English MPs September 1397
14th-century English politicians
Year of birth unknown
Members of Parliament for Bristol
1405 deaths
Mayors of Bristol